Frijoles Románticos is a primarily Latin-themed band from McAllen, Texas which blends rock, cumbia, Latin Funk, and ballad styles.

Members
Band members include Tury Alviar, Eddie Gonzalez, Noel Hernandez, Epi Martinez, Lucky Joe Paredes, and Aldo Solis.

Awards
In 2004, the Frijoles Romanticos, were nominated for Best Tejano Album of the 46th Annual Grammy Awards.

Epi Martinez of the Frijoles Romanticos won the 2007 Tejano Music Award for Percussion.

References

External links
 Frijoles Romanticos Official Web Site

Cumbia musical groups
Hispanic American music
Musical groups from Texas